Erick Zenón Norales Casildo (born 11 February 1985) is a Honduran football defender who plays for Platense.

Club career
Norales began his professional career with C.D.S. Vida in 2002, making eighty league appearances and scoring seven goals. From 2006 to 2011 he appeared in 118 league matches for C.D. Marathón, winning three straight Apertura season titles (2007–2008, 2008–2009, and 2009–2010). He returned to C.D. Vida in 2013, then went back to Marathón for the Liga Nacional's closing season.

On 10 February 2016, Norales signed for the newly formed NASL team Rayo OKC.

International career
He was part of the Honduran U-20 team at the 2005 World Youth Championship in the Netherlands.

He made his senior debut for the national side in an April 2007 friendly match against Haiti and has, as of January 2013, earned a total of 29 caps, scoring 2 goals. He has represented his country in 2 FIFA World Cup qualification matches and played at the 2009, and 2011 UNCAF Nations Cups as well as at the 2009 CONCACAF Gold Cup.

On 20 March 2008 Norales converted the final penalty kick in the semi finals of the 2008 CONCACAF Olympic Qualifying tournament, to guarantee qualification to the 2008 Olympic Games for Honduras. He would eventually play two matches at the 2008 Summer Olympics.

International goals
Scores and results list Honduras' goal tally first.

References

External links
 
 
 

1985 births
Living people
People from La Ceiba
Association football defenders
Honduran footballers
Honduras international footballers
Footballers at the 2008 Summer Olympics
Olympic footballers of Honduras
2009 UNCAF Nations Cup players
2009 CONCACAF Gold Cup players
2011 Copa Centroamericana players
2013 CONCACAF Gold Cup players
2014 Copa Centroamericana players
C.D.S. Vida players
C.D. Marathón players
Hunan Billows players
China League One players
Indy Eleven players
Rayo OKC players
Honduran expatriate footballers
Expatriate footballers in China
Honduran expatriate sportspeople in China
Liga Nacional de Fútbol Profesional de Honduras players
North American Soccer League players
Copa Centroamericana-winning players